Ambrose Upton Gledstanes Bury, KC (August 1, 1869 – March 29, 1951) was a politician in Alberta, Canada, a mayor of Edmonton, and a member of the House of Commons of Canada.

Early life

Ambrose Bury was born in Downings House, County Kildare, Ireland on August 1, 1869. The son of Charles Michael Bury and Margaret (Aylmer) Bury, among his siblings, were Charles Arthur Bury, Rev. Reginald Victor Bury, Rev. Fenton Ernest Bury, and Dr. Frederick William Bury.

He was educated at the Liverpool Institute, the Royal School in Raphoe, Dublin High School, Trinity College Dublin, and the King's Inns in Dublin, from which he received a Bachelor of Arts in 1890 and a Master of Arts in 1893. He taught theology and was the first principal of the Irish Baptist College in 1892.

He married Margaret Amy Beatrice Owen, from England, on June 16, 1897, with whom he had one son, William Bury.

He was called to the Irish Bar in 1906, and practiced law in Ireland before emigrating to Edmonton in 1912.  The following year, he was admitted to the Law Society of Alberta. He practiced law as a partner of Ewing, Harvie & Bury (later Harvie, Bury & Yanda), and was chancellor of the Anglican diocese at Athabasca from 1919.

Political career
Bury's first attempt at public office was running for the Legislative Assembly of Alberta in the 1921 provincial election as a Conservative in Edmonton.  He was defeated, finishing fourteenth of twenty-six candidates.

Later that year, in the 1921 municipal election, Bury was elected to the Edmonton City Council for a two-year term as alderman, finishing fourth of nineteen candidates in a race in which the top seven candidates were elected.  He was re-elected to another two-year term in the 1923 election.

Towards the end of his second term on council, Bury was elected to the House of Commons of Canada as a Conservative in the riding of Edmonton East in the 1925 election.  However, Parliament was dissolved amid the King-Byng Affair the following year, and Bury was narrowly defeated in the ensuing election by Liberal (and incumbent mayor of Edmonton) Kenny Blatchford.

Blatchford had taken his job, and Bury set out to take Blatchford's, running for mayor in the 1926 election.  He defeated Daniel Kennedy Knott (who went on to become mayor himself after Bury left municipal politics), and was re-elected in 1927 and 1928.  He did not seek re-election in 1929, anticipating a rematch against Blatchford in the next federal election.

Bury defeated Blatchford by a substantial margin in the 1930 election as R. B. Bennett's Conservative government swept to power. Following Bury's election as a Member of Parliament in 1930, the K.K.K. in Edmonton celebrated his election with a cross burning. The Edmonton Journal has written more specifically that the K.K.K. "erected a flaming cross on the hill above Riverdale flats to celebrate the victory of Edmonton East candidate Ambrose Bury."

Bury opted not to seek re-election in the 1935 election.  He was appointed as a district court judge that year, and served in that capacity until he reached the retirement age of 75 in 1944.

Later life and death

In 1946, Bury's wife died, and Bury moved to England to live with his brother.  He died in Ottawa March 29, 1951.  His funeral was held in Edmonton, and he was buried in the Edmonton Cemetery.

Bury had been an active Freemason.

References

Edmonton Public Library Biography of Ambrose Bury
City of Edmonton biography of Ambrose Bury

External links
 

1869 births
1951 deaths
Alumni of Trinity College Dublin
Alumni of King's Inns
People associated with the Irish Baptist College
Canadian Anglicans
Canadian people of Anglo-Irish descent
Edmonton city councillors
Conservative Party of Canada (1867–1942) MPs
Irish barristers
Irish emigrants to Canada (before 1923)
Judges in Alberta
Lawyers in Alberta
Mayors of Edmonton
Members of the House of Commons of Canada from Alberta
People from Athabasca County
Politicians from County Kildare
Progressive Conservative Association of Alberta candidates in Alberta provincial elections
20th-century Canadian politicians
Canadian King's Counsel